

Events

Works
Geoffrey Chaucer - The Book of the Duchess (probable date)

Births
date unknown
Paul of Venice, philosopher (died 1429)
Xie Jin, Chinese scholar-official and poet (died 1415)

Deaths
October (?) - Thomas Grey, English chronicler 
December 31 - Sir John Chandos, English knight whose herald produced The Life of the Black Prince (born 1320)
date unknown - Simon Tunsted, English Franciscan friar, theologian, philosopher and musician
probable - Prochoros Kydones, Greek theologian (born c.1330)

References

Literature
14th-century literature
Renaissance literature
History of literature
Lit
Literature by year